Bang Bang You're Dead is a 2002 American thriller drama television film directed by Guy Ferland and written by William Mastrosimone. It stars Tom Cavanagh, Ben Foster, Randy Harrison, and Janel Moloney. Based on Mastrosimone's 1999 play of the same name, the film is not a direct adaptation; it follows a troubled high school student played by Foster who participates in his school's production of the play while attempting to avoid going down the same path as the play's lead character.

The film premiered at the Seattle International Film Festival on June 7, 2002, and aired on Showtime on October 13, 2002.

Plot
16-year-old Trevor Adams attends an American high school where he is one of the outcasts harassed and humiliated by the school's jocks. He made a false threat to bomb the school a few months ago, narrowly escaping expulsion. Since then, Trevor has been trying to fit back in to normal high school life. He joined a theater group and has been chosen to star in a school play about school shootings called Bang Bang You're Dead as the main character, Josh. After parents and the community hear of the play and its lead actor, they call for it to be canceled.

But Trevor's theater activity, alone, is not sufficient to let off the steam of his boiling resentment. Using his video camera, he has been documenting bullying at school, creating a "diary of violence".

Trevor and his friends Sean, Mark and Kurt, make plans to storm the school with guns and kill as many of the hated athletes as possible. Trevor meets Jenny, also 16, who stays by him and stands up for him. Through her, Trevor begins to doubt whether the act he plans is right.

In the end, he is the only one to realize that bloodshed only fuels more violence and hatred, and evacuates the school with his art teacher, Mr. Duncan. At the last minute, Trevor prevents bloodshed by overwhelming Kurt, Sean and Mark.

The film ends with the play premiering successfully, despite the initial protests of the students' parents.

Cast

Tom Cavanagh as Mr. Val Duncan
Ben Foster as Trevor Adams
Randy Harrison as Sean
Janel Moloney as Ellie Milford
Jane McGregor as Jenny Dahlquist
David Paetkau as Brad Larkin
Garry Chalk as Chief Bud McGee
Eric Johnson as Mark Kentworth
Kristian Ayre as Kurt
 Brent Glenen as Zach
Gillian Barber as Principal Meyer
Eric Keenleyside as Bob Adams
Glynis Davies as Karen Adams
Fred Henderson as Dan Dahlquist
P. Lynn Johnson as Tanya Dahlquist
Richard de Klerk as Jessie
Steven Grayhm as Michael
Mark Holden as Officer Willow

Promotion
The song "Runaway Train" by post-grunge band Oleander was featured in the film. A music video for the song was then shot and incorporated footage from the film. On November 19, 2002 the band released their Runaway Train EP. The film was released on DVD on January 27, 2004 without any special features.

Awards

References

External links

 
 
 

2002 television films
2002 films
2002 thriller drama films
2000s American films
2000s English-language films
2000s teen drama films
American drama television films
American films based on plays
American teen drama films
American thriller drama films
American thriller television films
Films about bullying
Films about school violence
Films directed by Guy Ferland
Films scored by Reinhold Heil
Films scored by Johnny Klimek
Films shot in Vancouver
Peabody Award-winning broadcasts
Showtime (TV network) films
Works about the Columbine High School massacre